A banana bag (or rally pack) is a bag of IV fluids containing vitamins and minerals. The bags typically contain thiamine, folic acid, and magnesium sulfate, and are usually used to correct nutritional deficiencies or chemical imbalances in the human body. The solution has a yellow color, hence the term "banana bag".

Composition 

The typical composition of a banana bag is 1 liter of normal saline (sodium chloride 0.9%) with:

 Thiamine 100 mg
 Folic acid 1 mg
 Multivitamin for infusion (MVI), 1 ampule
 Magnesium sulfate 3 g

The solution is typically infused over four to eight hours or as per physician's orders. The yellow color comes from the riboflavin in the MVI and the folic acid. (The conventional composition is not optimal based on current evidence; see the Flannery et al. (2016) citation.)

Uses 

Banana bags are often prescribed for alcoholics. Chronic alcoholism can lead to significant lack of thiamine, potentially causing Wernicke–Korsakoff syndrome. Chronic alcoholics can also suffer significant whole-body magnesium deficiencies. However, recent evidence (2016) points that the amount of thiamine in a conventional banana bag is inadequate for prophylaxis and treatment for ICU patients.  The proposed regimen is 200–500 mg IV thiamine every eight hours for the first day of admission. Less evidence exists for the use of magnesium and folic acid, for which a less radical change in dosage is proposed.  No evidence for the use of multi-vitamins are found for alcoholics. Vitamin C is proposed to be added based on the prevalence of low blood levels among alcoholics, but its therapeutic usefulness is undefined.

Banana bags are used in the intensive care unit to correct acute magnesium deficiencies, a common occurrence in the ICU. Magnesium is stated to be beneficial for patients with terminal illness because deficiency can cause nerve pain and muscle cramps.

Banana bags (more narrowly, thiamine) are under-used when alcoholics present to the hospital with illnesses other than alcohol withdrawal, especially for critical illnesses such as sepsis, traumatic brain injury, and diabetic ketoacidosis. Using thiamine on septic alcoholics seems to reduce the rate of death.

See also 

 Intravenous therapy

References 

Intravenous fluids